Events in the year 1217 in Norway.

Incumbents
Monarch: Haakon IV Haakonsson

Events
June - Haakon Haakonson becomes King of Norway as Haakon IV.

Arts and literature

Births

Deaths
23 April – Inge II of Norway, king (born 1185).

Exact date missing
Philip Simonsson, pretender to the throne.

References

Norway